Leighton Hospital is a hospital located to the northwest of the town of Crewe in the county of Cheshire, England. It is managed by the Mid Cheshire Hospitals NHS Foundation Trust.

History
Built at a cost of £6 million, Leighton Hospital was officially opened by Queen Elizabeth II in May 1972. It replaced older facilities at Crewe District Memorial Hospital, Crewe Works Hospital (built by the London and North Western Railway Company), the Linden Grange Maternity Hospital and Coppenhall Hospital in Crewe, and Nantwich Cottage Hospital and the Barony Hospital in Nantwich.

Following an inspection in March 2018 the hospital was rated "good" by the Care Quality Commission and in June 2018 the hospital was recognised with a national award for patient experience.

In September 2021, a bid was submitted to the Department of Health and Social Care to fund a £663m redevelopment of the hospital. Materials used in its original construction, particularly reinforced autoclaved aerated concrete (RAAC) panels in the roof and walls, had resulted in significant spending to resolve safety risks. A new build was estimated to be around £100m cheaper than the continued refurbishment.

See also

 List of hospitals in England

References

External links
Leighton Hospital NHS Choices
Mid Cheshire Hospitals NHS Foundation Trust Website
Hospital webpage

Buildings and structures in Crewe
Hospitals in Cheshire
NHS hospitals in England